The following is a list of things named in Jakob Bernoulli's honour:
 Bernoulli's formula
 Bernoulli differential equation
 Bernoulli's inequality
 Bernoulli numbers
 Bernoulli polynomials
 Bernoulli's quadrisection problem
 Lemniscate of Bernoulli

Probability
 Bernoulli distribution
 Bernoulli process
 Bernoulli scheme
 Bernoulli trial
 Bernoulli map
 Bernoulli operator
 Bernoulli sampling
 Bernoulli random variable
 Bernoulli's Golden Theorem
 Hidden Bernoulli model

Bernoulli, Jakob